Galabovo (from гълъб galab, "dove" + -ovo) is a town in south-central Bulgaria, part of Stara Zagora Province. It is the administrative centre of the homonymous Galabovo Municipality. As of December 2009, the town has a population of 8,404 inhabitants.

Galabovo is located in the southeastern part of the Upper Thracian Plain, in a region economically important due to the extraction of coal and production of electricity in the region. The Maritsa Iztok-1 power plant is situated nearby. The population is predominantly Bulgarian and Bulgarian Orthodox, the employment is pretty high, with the residents employed for the most part in the coal, compressed slacks and electricity industry.

Municipality
Galabovo is also the seat of Galabovo municipality (part of Stara Zagora Province), which in addition to the town also includes the following 10 villages:

References

External links
 Galabovo municipality website
 Galabovo municipality at Domino.bg

Towns in Bulgaria
Populated places in Stara Zagora Province